Leutnant Otto Creutzmann (8 January 1892 – 12 January 1943) was a World War I flying ace credited with eight aerial victories.

Early life and ground service
Otto Creutzmann was born in Spickendorf Halle an der Salle on 8 January 1892. He joined the German army in 1914, as World War I began. He saw ground combat until June 1915, when he was wounded by shellfire. He then joined the Die Fliegertruppen des deutschen Kaiserreiches (Imperial German Air Service).

Aerial service

Creutzmann began his flying service with Kampfgeschwader (Tactical Bombing Wing) 2. He transferred to Staffel 33, then moved on to Kampfstaffel (Tactical Bomber Squadron) 23 of Kampfgeschwader (Tactical Bombing Wing) 4. One of Creutzmann's observers in this assignment was Lothar von Richthofen. Creutzmann was awarded the Kingdom of Saxony's Albert Order on 1 December 1916.

On 6 February 1917, he transferred to Jagdstaffel 20. On 11 July 1917, he shot down an Airco DH.4 from No. 57 Squadron RFC over Ledgehem, Belgium for his first aerial victory. On 12 August 1917, he was forwarded to Kampfeinsitzerstaffel (Combat Single-seater Squadron) 4.

On 20 February 1918, Creutzmann transferred yet again, to Jagdstaffel 43. He suffered a slight wound in May. He stayed until 13 June, upgrading to flying a Fokker Dr.I Triplane while with the squadron. He was then promoted to command as a Staffelführer, and scored his last three victories while commanding Royal Prussian Jagdstaffel 46. On 19 July 1918, he was presented the Military Order of St. Henry. He headed Jasta 46 until the end of the war.

World War II
Otto Creutzmann served as an Oberleutnant in the German Army during the Second World War and was killed in action on the Eastern Front on 12 January 1943.

Sources of information

References

 Franks, Norman; Bailey, Frank W.; Guest, Russell. Above the Lines: The Aces and Fighter Units of the German Air Service, Naval Air Service and Flanders Marine Corps, 1914–1918. Grub Street, 1993. .

1892 births
1943 deaths
German World War I flying aces
People from Saalekreis
People from the Province of Saxony
Recipients of the Iron Cross (1914), 1st class
German Army officers of World War II
Luftwaffe personnel killed in World War II
Military personnel from Saxony-Anhalt